A Campus Kitchen is an on-campus student service program that is a member of the nonprofit organization, The Campus Kitchens Project. At a Campus Kitchen, students use on-campus kitchen space and donated food from their cafeterias to prepare and deliver nourishing meals to their communities.

The organization is headquartered in Washington, D.C. on the campus of Gonzaga College High School. There are currently 63 Campus Kitchens, located in Saint Louis, Missouri; Evanston, Illinois; Milwaukee, Wisconsin; Minneapolis, Minnesota; Spokane, Washington; Mankato, Minnesota; Washington, D.C.; Lexington, Virginia; Winston-Salem, North Carolina; Kearney, Nebraska; Williamsburg, Virginia; Gettysburg, Pennsylvania; Baltimore, Maryland; and more (see full list of Campus Kitchens below).

Operations 

 Each Campus Kitchen is hosted by a school who shares space in one dining hall's kitchen, which is termed the "Campus Kitchen." (Usually, this space is used during less busy or off-hours for the dining hall, such as evenings and weekends.)
 Students go to dining halls and cafeterias at designated times to pick up unserved, usable food. (The dining services companies who donate are protected from liability concerns under the Bill Emerson Good Samaritan Food Donation Act.)
 Students prepare meals using that donated food, as well as food from local food banks, restaurants, grocery stores and farmers markets.
 Then, students deliver meals free of charge to individuals and agencies in the school's neighboring community in need of food assistance.  Agencies include homeless shelters, food banks, soup kitchens, and individuals or families in need of food assistance.
 Student volunteers also provide empowerment-based education to clients, such as nutrition education to children, healthy cooking classes to families and culinary job training to unemployed adults.

History 

The Campus Kitchens Project was developed in 2001 as a national outgrowth of DC Central Kitchen, a successful local community kitchen model in Washington DC.

In 1989, Robert Egger, founder and CEO of DC Central Kitchen, pioneered the idea of recycling food from around Washington DC and using it as a tool to train unemployed adults to develop valuable work skills. DCCK became a national model, and as the idea grew, and groups around the country started to open kitchens, Robert started looking for a way to engage the thousands of underutilized school cafeterias and student volunteers in the effort, particularly in rural communities. In the mid-1990s, he piloted a job training program in 10 schools across the U.S. with the American School Food Service, with funding from the USDA.

In 1999, two Wake Forest University students, Jessica Shortall and Karen Borchert, created a small student organization called Homerun that engaged students in cooking and delivering dinners to folks in the community. What started as a hobby instead became a successful campus organization. After graduating, Borchert came to work at DCCK.

In 2001, the two concepts came together, and with a start-up grant from the Sodexo Foundation, The Campus Kitchens Project piloted its first program at Saint Louis University in Missouri.

Current locations

 Atlantic City
 Auburn University
 Augsburg University
 Baylor University
 Baldwin Wallace University
 College of William & Mary
 East Carolina University
 Elon University
 Emory University
 Georgia Tech
 Gettysburg College
 Gonzaga College High School
 Gonzaga University
 Indiana University - Purdue University Indianapolis
 Johns Hopkins University
 Kent State University
 
 Lee University
 Marquette University
 Meredith College
 Minnesota State University, Mankato
 Northwestern University
 Sacred Heart Prep., Atherton, CA
 Saint Louis University
 Saint Peter's University
 Southern Illinois University Edwardsville
 St. Andrew's Episcopal School
 St. Lawrence University
 Troy University
 Union College
 University of Detroit Mercy
 University of Florida
 
 University of Georgia
 University of Kentucky
 University of Maryland Eastern Shore
 University of Massachusetts Boston
 University of Nebraska-Kearney
 University of Vermont
 University of Virginia
 University of Wisconsin-Eau Claire
 University of Wisconsin-Green Bay
 University of Wisconsin-Madison
 Virginia Tech
 Wake Forest University
 Walsh University
 Washington, DC
 Washington & Lee University
 Washington University in St. Louis
Westtown School

References
Northwestern University Observer: September 23, 2004 - Campus Kitchen puts food on the table
Stop Hunger - The Campus Kitchens Project
Saint Louis University Newslink: September 21, 2006: SLU Campus Kitchen Celebrates Five Years
Washington Post: January 24, 2009: A Fresh Look at How to Best Get Food to 35 Million

External links
The Campus Kitchens Project Official site.
DC Central Kitchen

Charities based in Washington, D.C.
Youth organizations based in the United States
2001 establishments in the United States
Organizations established in 2001